Voting to elect six members of the Lebanese parliament took place in the Bekaa II district (one of three electoral districts in Bekaa region) on 6 May 2018, part of the general election of that year. The constituency had 143,653 who voted. The district elects 2 Sunni, 1 Druze, 1 Greek Orthodox, 1 Maronite, 1 Shia. It covers the West Bekaa and the Rashaya districts.

Demographics 
In the second Bekaa electoral district, nearly half of the electorate is Sunni (48.8%). 14.8% of the electorate is Druze, 14.7% Shia, 7.42% Greek Catholic, 7.22% Maronite and 7.16% Greek Orthodox.

Voting 
In the West Bekaa-Rachaya electoral district 3 lists were registered. The Future Movement and the Progressive Socialist Party formed a joint list. Notably this list included Mohammed Qar'awi, owner of the Bekaa Hospital, a personality previously linked to the March 8 Alliance. Amin Wahbi, founder and leader of the Democratic Left Movement was included on the Future list.

The "Best Tomorrow" list is mainly backed by the Amal Movement. In the end the Free Patriotic Movement did not join the Amal-sponsored list, leaving Greek Orthodox candidate Elie Ferzli to join it as an individual though he was still a member of FPM's bloc in parliament.

TV presenter Maguy Aoun is headed a third list, organized by civil society candidates.

The Lebanese Forces had tried to form a list with Ashraf Rifi to contest the election, but such a list did not materialize. Likewise, the Lebanese Democratic Party opted to withdrawal its candidate Dr. Nizar Zaki.

Candidates

References 

2018 Lebanese general election
2018 in Lebanon
2018 elections in Asia